Ishmael Samuel Mills Le-Maire (August 29, 1912 – 1984) was the first Ghanaian Bishop of Accra from 1968 to 1982.

Ordained in 1936, he was Canon of Accra and Archdeacon of Sekondi from 1960 until 1963 when he was elevated to the episcopate as an assistant bishop.

He was Archbishop of the Church of the Province of West Africa from 1981 to 1982.

References

1912 births
1984 deaths
Ghanaian Anglicans
Anglican archdeacons in Africa
Anglican bishops of Accra
20th-century Anglican archbishops
Anglican archbishops of West Africa